Denton railway station serves the town of Denton in Tameside, Greater Manchester, England, on the Stockport–Stalybridge line. It is served by two trains a week, one in each direction on Saturday mornings.

The orientation of the line, running south-west to north-east, is a clue to its origin; it stands on the former mainline of the London & North Western Railway between Crewe and Leeds via Stockport. The London & North Western Railway had already completed its line to Manchester via Stockport and now looked to expand to reach the woollen districts of the West Riding of Yorkshire, building quadruple tracks all the way to Huddersfield and Leeds via the Standedge tunnel.

History

The line between Guide Bridge and Heaton Norris Junction (north of ) was surveyed by the Manchester and Birmingham Railway in 1845 (shortly before it became part of the London and North Western Railway), and opened in 1849.  A new station was opened by the LNWR in 1888 and the route was quadrupled in 1889. Before the Railways Act 1921, it was served by trains from Stockport to Ashton, Oldham, Rochdale and Stalybridge. A very limited passenger service ran to Manchester. Stalybridge could also be reached via  and the Stalybridge Junction Railway. This route was opened in 1882  by the LNWR to avoid the congested junction at Guide Bridge, but closed to passengers in 1950.

The older route via Guide Bridge remained a useful link between the northern and southern Manchester rail networks and this ensured its continued use by British Rail until the late 1980s – before May 1989, an hourly service ran on weekdays along the route.  The re-routing of the Leeds–Huddersfield–Manchester express service to Manchester Piccadilly at the May 1989 timetable change made the service essentially redundant though, as travellers could then access south Manchester services directly at Piccadilly, and its frequency was substantially cut: by 1992, it had been reduced to just a single weekly train (the statutory minimum level necessary to avoid the requirement for formal closure proceedings).

North of the station is Denton Junction where the line divides, with the mainline going to Guide Bridge and the little-used branch to Ashton Moss. The latter route is normally used only by freight and empty stock transfer workings but is used also for diversions if the main line between Stockport and Manchester Piccadilly is closed for engineering work.

A further line to Droylsden diverged from this ( further on at Ashton Moss Junction), which at one time was used by direct trains from the East Lancashire Line to London Euston. That line was closed in 1969 and subsequently lifted. The LNWR built a short-lived station called Audenshaw on that line, which opened in 1888 and closed in 1905.

The station is a request stop, having two platforms in an island layout. In theory, prospective passengers must flag down the train as it approaches the station. However, in practice the train usually stops at every station on the line even if no passenger is waiting.

Least used station 

With 30 passenger entries and exits between April 2011 and March 2012, Denton was the third-least used station in Great Britain. By 2015–16, the estimate of station usage had changed little, with 37 passenger journeys recorded for an entire year on the weekly train to Stalybridge. In 2018/19, Denton was deemed the least used station in Great Britain, tied with Stanlow & Thornton. Reddish South station, also in Greater Manchester and one stop south of the station, was ranked the third least used with just 60 entries and exits.

Closure proposal

Network Rail, in their Route Utilisation Strategy (RUS) for the North West, were proposing closure of Reddish South and Denton stations and withdrawal of the remaining passenger service. The line itself would remain open for freight and diverted passenger workings. However, an open-access operator called Grand Central had proposed using the line for services between London Euston and Bradford Interchange via the West Coast Main Line, using Guide Bridge station as a stop. That proposal has since been dropped.

The promotion of a passenger service through Denton Station seems uncertain, whilst the future of freight traffic seems more assured as evidenced by the North West Rail Utilisation Strategy May 2007 of Network Rail. A more frequent service was considered for the 2008 timetable shakeup, which was designed to implement major changes to service patterns on the West Coast Main Line; however, because of the track layout and congestion at Heaton Norris, operational analysis suggests "Timetabling the move across Heaton Norris is very likely to be problematic. Performance could be impacted by the crossing move at Heaton Norris Junction. If there are two passenger trains an hour on this line, it will be more difficult to hold freight trains on the Denton line, additionally affecting performance."

"[Reddish South and] Denton receives a minimal (once a week) service because anticipated demand has not justified increasing it. The operating cost of providing a service at this station exceeds the revenue and socio-economic benefit they generate, even before periodic renewal costs are considered." It further goes on to say that for passenger effects "The stations are both served by one train a week on a Saturday, in one direction only. A full impact analysis would be required prior to formal closure procedures, but it is reasonable to assume that any journey that could be made using this service could equally well be made by another mode. Data collection including observation on a representative Saturday has been unable to record any use of these stations. Consultation respondents cautioned against this option whilst uncertainty remains about local regeneration."

There is, however, an issue with this statement that the one-train-a-week service is on a Friday and not a Saturday, so it is most unlikely any passenger activity will be recorded.

The future of freight using the line through Denton seems to be more assured. It is proposed to improve gauge clearance to allow intermodal trains to/from Trafford Park to divert via Denton. A lack of a diversionary route for some freight trains to/from Trafford Park causes poor performance when there is disruption on the primary route. It also means that this traffic cannot run when there is a planned closure of the route.  It is proposed to carry out this work provided it can be done at little or no extra cost through renewal works.

In the 2012 North West Route Utilisation Strategy Final Recommendations it was reported that provision of W9 and W10 gauge clearance that will allow intermodal trains to/from Trafford Park to divert via Denton, thus improving performance when the primary route is disrupted or closed (when traffic can not run) had been implemented. There were no remarks concerning RUS 5.3.2, the Stockport corridor.

Services 
In the 20 May 2018 timetable changes, Northern introduced a return service at the station and changed the day of operation to Saturday. This was the first time in over twenty years that the station has had a service in both directions.

References

External links

 Friends of Denton Station
 Pictures of Reddish South and Denton stations on Flickr
 Timetable, Denton station

Railway stations in Tameside
DfT Category F2 stations
Former London and North Western Railway stations
Northern franchise railway stations
Low usage railway stations in the United Kingdom
Denton, Greater Manchester